Monte Meidassa is a peak in the Cottian Alps, in western Piedmont, northern Italy. The slightly higher Monte Granero is located nearby.

Geography 
Administratively it is divided between the Metropolitan City of Turin and the province of Cuneo, both in the Piedmont region.
Included in the comuni of Crissolo and Bobbio Pellice, not far from the boundary with France, it has an elevation of 3,105 m. It separates the Valle Pellice and the Valle Po.

SOIUSA classification 
According to the SOIUSA (International Standardized Mountain Subdivision of the Alps) the mountain can be classified in the following way:
 main part = Western Alps
 major sector = South Western Alps
 section = Cottian Alps
 subsection = southern Cottian Alps
 supergroup = catena Aiguillette-Monviso-Granero
 group = gruppo Granero-Frioland
 subgroup = gruppo del Monte Granero 
 code = I/A-4.I-C.9.a

References

External links

 Monte Meidassa, Italy on peakbagger.com

Mountains of Piedmont
Alpine three-thousanders
Three-thousanders of Italy